The Château des Amerois is a 19th-century neo-gothic style castle in the Ardennes forest, south-east of Bouillon, Wallonia, Belgium. Replacing an original building destroyed by fire, the current castle was built from 1874 to 1877 for Prince Philippe, Count of Flanders.

History 

The domain was originally purchased in 1849 by the Count of Mesniel, who acquired land to build a manor house. In 1859, the property was purchased by Theodore van der Noot, 8th Marquess of Assche. Ten years later, the property was sold to Prince Philippe, Count of Flanders, the brother of Leopold II of Belgium.

After a fire destroyed the first castle in 1873, Philippe of Belgium commissioned the architect Gustave Saintenoy to build a replacement. The chapel received special attention and received polychromes by Jules Helbig. The park houses redwoods and a 158-meter-long bower. Thousands of plant and flower species were grown in several greenhouses. Prince Philippe also planned sumptuous stables. Passionate about hunting, he spent several months a year at the castle. His wife, Princess Marie of Hohenzollern-Sigmaringen, made sketches and water-colors.

When Prince Philippe died in 1905, his three children inherited the castle and sold it to the Liège wood merchant Robert Colette for 7 million francs. He cut down practically all the trees and resold the property three years later to Alice Solvay, the niece of Ernest Solvay. Today, the estate still belongs to his descendants.

During the First World War, a patrol of German soldiers commanded by Lt. Wolf-Werner von Blumenthal of the 2nd Reserve Heavy Cavalry occupied the castle which left it without major damage, except in the wine cellar.

Residents 
 1849: Count of Mesniel
 1859: Theodore van der Noot, 8th Marquess of Assche
 1868: Prince Philippe, Count of Flanders
 1924: Robert Colette
 1927: Alice Solvay

See also 

List of castles in Belgium

References

Castles in the Ardennes (Belgium)
Castles in Belgium
Castles in Luxembourg (Belgium)
Chateau des Amerois
Royal residences in Belgium